Will Gluck (born November 7, 1978) is an American film director, film producer, screenwriter, songwriter, and composer.

Life and career
Gluck is the son of American academic and Japanologist Carol Gluck and architect Peter L. Gluck. He began his career as a television writer, working on such shows as Grosse Pointe, Luis and Andy Richter Controls the Universe. He co-created and produced the Fox series The Loop with Pam Brady. He then became a feature director and his first effort was the film Fired Up which was released on February 20, 2009.  His next film was 2010's Easy A, starring Emma Stone, Thomas Haden Church, Patricia Clarkson, Stanley Tucci, Lisa Kudrow, and Penn Badgley among others, which he also rewrote and produced.  It grossed $75 million worldwide and was nominated for a People's Choice Award, Golden Globe Award (for Stone), Critics Choice Award for Best Comedy (which it won), GLAAD award, A.C.E. award, among others.

His project Friends with Benefits was released on July 22, 2011 and stars Justin Timberlake and Mila Kunis. The ensemble cast includes Woody Harrelson, Jenna Elfman, Richard Jenkins, Patricia Clarkson, and Emma Stone. The film went on to gross over $150 million worldwide  and was nominated for a People's Choice Award (for Mila Kunis) as well as a nomination for Best Comedy Film.

He directed the remake of Annie (2014), filmed in New York City. It starred Quvenzhané Wallis, Jamie Foxx, Cameron Diaz, Rose Byrne, and Bobby Cannavale.  It was produced by Gluck, Will Smith, James Lassiter, and Jay-Z. It grossed over $139 million worldwide.

He co-created, directed, and produced Michael J. Fox's 2013-2014 return to TV.  The Michael J. Fox Show launched to critical acclaim and a first week audience of 16 million people.

In June 2017, Gluck and his Olive Bridge Entertainment production company reupped its film deal with Sony Pictures Entertainment encompassing Columbia Pictures and signed a new television deal with Entertainment One. They are currently in production of Woke for Hulu, Encore!  for Disney+, an untitled adult animated show for Netflix, Sneakerheads for Netflix, along with a slate of other development.

Gluck's following film, Peter Rabbit, was released on February 9, 2018. It stars Rose Byrne, Domhnall Gleeson, and the voices of James Corden, Margot Robbie, Daisy Ridley, Elizabeth Debicki, and Sia. It became his most successful film financially to date grossing over $351 million worldwide.

His latest movie Peter Rabbit 2: The Runaway was scheduled to be released around the world in March, but was postponed due to the COVID-19 pandemic. It was subsequently released around the world on June 11, 2021.

Television
Grosse Pointe (2000–01)
Andy Richter Controls the Universe (2001–02)
Luis (2003–04) (also creator)
The Loop (2006–07) (also co-creator)
The Michael J. Fox Show (2013–14) (also co-creator)
The McCarthys (2014–15)
Moonbeam City (2015)
Angry Angel (2017)
Encore! (2019–)
Woke (2020–)
Sneakerheads (2020–)
Chicago Party Aunt (2021–)

Feature films

Awards

References

External links

Living people
American male screenwriters
Film directors from New York City
Writers from New York City
Film producers from New York (state)
Television producers from New York City
American television writers
American male television writers
Screenwriters from New York (state)
Cornell University alumni
United Nations International School alumni
Comedy film directors
Fantasy film directors
American expatriates in Canada
1978 births